Willielma Campbell, Viscountess Glenorchy (1741–17 July 1786) was a patroness of evangelical missionary work in Scotland and beyond.

Willielma Maxwell was born, in Galloway, as the daughter of the wealthy William Maxwell of Preston and Elizabeth Hairstanes. On 26 September 1761, she married John Campbell, Viscount Glenorchy, eldest son of John Campbell, 3rd Earl of Breadalbane and Holland, one of Scotland's wealthiest landowners. 

In 1765, while recovering from illness, she came under the influence of Jane Hill, the sister of Rowland Hill (the evangelical Anglican preacher) and experienced a religious conversion. Particularly after her husband's death in 1771, she devoted herself and her wealth to furthering evangelical causes, becoming an influential figure in Scottish Church affairs. She held evangelistic services in her Edinburgh home open to both rich and poor, and also established several chapels in both Scotland and England. She influenced many to enter the ministry.

Chapels

In 1772, inspired by Alexander Webster, she set up a chapel, Lady Glenorchy's Church, in Edinburgh. This was situated in the narrow gap between the Edinburgh Orphanage and Trinity College Kirk. What was unusual for the time was the ecumenical nature of the enterprise, in that the intention was that Presbyterian, Episcopalian and Methodist ministers would be invited to preach. In 1772 she met Lady Henrietta Hope and they travelled together and were lifelong friends.

In 1773, Lady Glenorchy renovated the chapel in Strathfillan, Perthshire and, under the auspices of the Scottish SPCK provided an endowment for a minister and two regional missionaries in that region.

Another chapel, bearing her name, was opened in Edinburgh in 1774. This time, however, it was intended solely for the Church of Scotland. The chapel was intended to serve as an independent place of worship for those who could not be accommodated within the existing parish church buildings, and included a school. It became a bastion of Evangelical Protestantism for the next seventy years. The hymn writer Horatius Bonar grew up in it (indeed his brother was the Session Clerk). 

Further chapels were constructed in England during her travels the last ten years of her life. In 1777 there was one in Exmouth and in 1781 one in Carlisle. In 1784 she bought a house in Matlock where she and Lady Hope lived. It became a chapel in 1786. In 1784 they visited Hotwells where Lady Hope pledged £2,500 towards a chapel that Campbell agreed to complete. They both died in 1786 so it was Cambell's executor who completed Hope Chapel that was named for her friend. A chapel in Workington was also built in 1786.

Ecumenism
Despite the ecumenical nature of her first chapel, Lady Glenorchy retained her Calvinist leanings. In the year the chapel opened, Lady Glenorchy met with John Wesley, who attempted to persuade her to join his Methodist movement - but without success. Indeed, shortly after this, her chapel was closed to Methodists, in response the refusal of some Church of Scotland ministers to preach in it.

Death and legacy
Lady Glenorchy died on 17 July 1786 in George Square, Edinburgh. She was buried in Lady Glenorchy's Church in central Edinburgh. The service was held by Rev Thomas Snell Jones.

She had no surviving children. To ensure that her favoured evangelical enterprises would flourish, she left much of her £30,000 estate to her chapels, to the Scottish SPCK, and to a fund for educating young ministers.

Her biography was written by Rev Thomas Snell Jones DD minister of the Lady Glenorchy Church.

The construction of Waverley Station forced her exhumation in 1840. She was re-interred in the newly built Lady Glenorchy's Chapel at Low Calton on Greenside Place. The church has been demolished, with the faced being retained and incorporated into The Glasshouse Hotel.

References

Sources
Currie, D. A. 'Glenorchy, Lady' in 'Dictionary of Scottish History and Theology' Cameron et al. (eds.) Edinburgh, 1993  

Campbell, Willielma (Lady Glenorchy)
Campbell, Willielma (Lady Glenorchy)
Campbell, Willielma (Lady Glenorchy)
Campbell, Willielma (Lady Glenorchy)
People from Dumfries and Galloway
Scottish Presbyterians
Glenorchy
Scottish philanthropists